During the 1898–99 English football season, Brentford competed in the Southern League Second Division London. Though the season was largely viewed as a disappointment, the Bees finished in 4th place.

Season summary 

Brentford enjoyed a meteoric rise in London amateur football during a three-year period, going from playing only friendly and cup matches in 1895–96, to being promoted through the London League and elected into the Southern League for 1898–99 season. The club paid for its success and a number of its better players were lured away during the off-season, with forwards Oakey Field and David Lloyd turning professional and signing for Sheffield United and Thames Ironworks respectively. On the financial front, attendances had consistently improved year-on-year for the previous three seasons, but the leaseholder of the club's Shotter's Lane ground took the opportunity to increase the rent to an unacceptable amount. The club, which had made a loss on the previous season, were forced to move out of Brentford to Cross Roads, an unsatisfactory patch of ground located near South Ealing tube station. To compound the financial problems, while the club remained officially amateur, it was illegally forced to pay some of its new signings more than their travelling expenses to entice them to play.

Despite the goals of Oakey Field's replacement C. Ward, Brentford had a modest start to life in the London section of the Southern League Second Division, but after the departure of Ward in early November 1898, wins over Southall and St Albans put the club top of the division late in the month. The Bees subsequently fell away badly, taking just one point from a possible 10 over the next five matches. After winning two cups during the previous season, the club experienced little joy in 1898–99, suffering early exits in the FA Cup, London Senior Cup, Middlesex Senior Cup and suffering a semi-final defeat to Harrow Athletic in the West Middlesex Cup. The club entered the FA Amateur Cup for the only time, but withdrew after progressing to the second round. Though the season was largely a disappointment, Brentford finished in a credible 4th place in the London section of the Southern League Second Division.

League table

Results
Brentford's goal tally listed first.

Legend

Southern League Second Division London

FA Cup

London Senior Cup

Middlesex Senior Cup

West Middlesex Cup 

 Source: 100 Years of Brentford

Playing squad

Left club during season

 "Gosling" is an alias
 Source: 100 Years of Brentford

Statistics

Goalscorers 

Players listed in italics left the club mid-season.
Source: 100 Years Of Brentford

Management

Summary

Notes

References 

Brentford F.C. seasons
Brentford